Canaverys may refer to:
 Joaquín Canaverys (1789–1840?), Argentine government official in the Cabildo.
 Juan Canaverys (1748–1822), Italian notary and functionary, or official, for the viceroyalty of Río de la Plata
 José Canaverys (1780–1837), Argentine Soldier, Notary, Prosecutor and Accountant
 Manuel Canaverys (1787–1830), Argentine army officer, Lieutenant in the Regiment of Patricians

See also
 Canavery (disambiguation)